Maha Sawat is one of the nine subdistricts (tambon) of Bang Kruai district, in Nonthaburi province, Thailand. Neighbouring subdistricts are (from north clockwise) Bang Khun Kong, Bang Khanun, Wat Chalo, Taling Chan, Chimphli, Plai Bang and Bang Khu Wiang. In 2020 it had a total population of 20,697 people.

Administration

Central administration
The subdistrict is subdivided into 7 administrative villages (muban).

Local administration
The area of the subdistrict is shared by two local administrative organizations.
Plai Bang Subdistrict Municipality
Maha Sawat Subdistrict Administrative Organization

References

External links
Website of Plai Bang Subdistrict Municipality
Website of Maha Sawat Subdistrict Administrative Organization

Tambon of Nonthaburi province
Populated places in Nonthaburi province